Edward A. Diebolt House is a historic home located at Buffalo in Erie County, New York.  It is a Colonial Revival style frame house built in 1922–1923. It is representative of the standardized floor plan home constructed in the immediate post-World War I period and retains complete integrity.

It was listed on the National Register of Historic Places in 2006.  It is located in the University Park Historic District.

References

External links
Diebolt, Edward A., House - U.S. National Register of Historic Places on Waymarking.com

Houses on the National Register of Historic Places in New York (state)
Houses completed in 1923
Colonial Revival architecture in New York (state)
Houses in Buffalo, New York
Architecture of Buffalo, New York
National Register of Historic Places in Buffalo, New York
Historic district contributing properties in Erie County, New York
Individually listed contributing properties to historic districts on the National Register in New York (state)